Ascari can refer to:

 Ascari (surname), an Italian surname
 Askari, a colonial soldier
 Eritrean Ascari
 Ascari, an Italian Soldati-class destroyer
 Ascari Cars, a British automobile manufacturer
 Ascari Bicycles, a bicycle manufacturer in the US
 Circuito Ascari, a resort with a motorsports track in Málaga, Spain